Guevenatten is a commune in the Haut-Rhin department in Alsace in north-eastern France.

Geography
Situated 6 km northwest of Dannemarie, Guevenatten occupies a rather rare site in Sundgau, because it is perched on the line of crests separating the valleys of Traubach and Soultzbach, both tributaries of the left bank of releases her(it).

Guevenatten stretches along the R.D.14, twice connecting the RN83 (Main road 83) to Dannemarie by Traubach-le-Haut. On the north of the village, the Sternenberg is the highest point in the municipality at 370 m.

The village preserved a rural character. The surface of the banns is of 217 ha, the used agricultural space represents 87,2%. The woody surface, included in the agricultural space, is of 58 ha of which 35ha of municipal forest.

See also
 Communes of the Haut-Rhin département

References

External links

Official website

Communes of Haut-Rhin